Arasaxa, also known as Arathia and Arassaxa, was a town of ancient Cappadocia, inhabited during Roman and Byzantine times. It may be this Arathia which was a bishopric in antiquity (see Arathia).

Its site is located near Akmescit, Asiatic Turkey.

References

Populated places in ancient Cappadocia
Former populated places in Turkey
Populated places of the Byzantine Empire
Roman towns and cities in Turkey
History of Kayseri Province